Untogether is an American drama film directed by Emma Forrest. Her directorial debut, it stars Jamie Dornan, Ben Mendelsohn, Lola Kirke and Jemima Kirke. The film centers on a recovering addict who attempts to get her writing career back on track.

It had its world premiere at the Tribeca Film Festival on April 23, 2018. It was released in a limited release and through video on demand on February 8, 2019 by Freestyle Releasing Media.

Cast
 Jemima Kirke as Andrea Moore
 Lola Kirke as Tara Moore
 Jamie Dornan as Nick
 Ben Mendelsohn as Martin
 Billy Crystal as David
 Alice Eve as Irene
 Jennifer Grey as Josie
 Scott Caan as Ellis

Production
Screenwriter Emma Forrest makes her feature directorial debut in this film, for which she also wrote the screenplay; her ex-husband Ben Mendelsohn also stars. Jemima Kirke and Lola Kirke, real-life sisters, also have their first collaboration in the film, which began production on October 17, 2016. In November 2016, Billy Crystal and Jennifer Grey joined the cast.

Release
The film had its world premiere at the Tribeca Film Festival on April 23, 2018. Shortly after, Freestyle Digital Media acquired distribution rights to the film, and set it for a February 8, 2019, release.

References

External links
 
 
2018 films
2018 directorial debut films
2018 drama films
2018 independent films
American drama films
2010s English-language films
Films about writers
2010s American films